Ubaldo is a masculine Italian and Spanish given name, from Germanic hug "mind" and bald "bold". Notable people with the name include:
Ubald of Gubbio (Ubaldo Baldassini) (c. 1084 – 1160), Italian bishop and Catholic saint
Guido Ubaldo Abbatini (1600–1656), Italian painter of the Baroque period
Ubaldo Aquino (born 1958), football (soccer) referee from Paraguay
Ubaldo Bellugi (1899–1992), Italian poet, writer and playwright and Podestà of Massa
Ubaldo Caccianemici (died 1171), Italian cardinal and cardinal-nephew of Pope Lucius II
Ubaldo Fillol (born 1950), Argentine football coach and former goalkeeper
Ubaldo Gandolfi (1728–1781), Italian painter of the late-Baroque period
Ubaldo Giraldi (1692–1775), Italian canonist
Ubaldo Heredia (born 1956), former Major League Baseball right-handed starting pitcher
Ubaldo I Visconti (died 1230), the de jure overlord of the Giudicato of Cagliari from 1217
Ubaldo Jiménez (born 1984), Major League Baseball starting pitcher
Ubaldo Mesa (1973–2005), male professional road cyclist from Colombia
Ubaldo Nestor Sacco (1955–1997), Argentine boxer
Ubaldo of Gallura, the Judge of Gallura from 1225 to his death in 1238
Ubaldo Passalacqua (born 1918), Italian professional football player
Ubaldo Ranzi, Italian bobsledder who competed in the late 1990s and the early 2000s
João Ubaldo Ribeiro (born 1941), Brazilian author born in Itaparica, Bahia
Ubaldo Ricci, Italian painter of the late-Baroque who practised in Italy in the 18th century
Ubaldo Righetti (born 1963), retired Italian professional football player
Ubaldo Soddu (1883–1949), Italian military officer, commanded the Italian Forces in the Greco-Italian War for a month
Ubaldo Terzano, Italian cinematographer and camera operator, with numerous collaborations with Mario Ubaldo

See also
Juan Ubaldo (born 1979), boxer from the Dominican Republic
Marie-Claire D'Ubaldo
Hucbald
Saint Ubaldo Day, Jessup, Pennsylvania's observance of Gubbio, Italy's La Festa dei Ceri

Italian masculine given names
Italian names of Germanic origin